The Canon ELPH 10 AF was an inexpensive compact point and shoot camera for the Advanced Photo System released in October 1996. Part of Canon's long-running ELPH series, it was sold in Japan as the IXY 20 and in Europe as the IXUS AF-S. The ELPH 10 AF had a 24 mm f/6.7 lens, active autofocus, a built-in electronic flash, and a simple automatic exposure system which selected between two shutter speeds.

Canon ELPH cameras
Autofocus cameras
Point-and-shoot cameras
APS film cameras